The Seimat language is one of three Western Admiralty Islands languages, the other two being Wuvulu-Aua and the extinct Kaniet. The language is spoken by approximately 1000 people on the Ninigo and the Anchorite Islands in western Manus Province of Papua New Guinea. It has subject–verb–object (SVO) word order.

References

Further reading

External links 
 Kaipuleohone has recordings and written materials for Seimat 

Admiralty Islands languages
Languages of Manus Province
Subject–verb–object languages